Pascal Martin (1952 – 3 August 2020) was a French journalist and writer.

Biography
In the 1980s, Martin co-created the Agence de diffusion de l'information (ADIR) and produced a series of films on the Lebanese Civil War in Beirut, the trafficking of skeletons in Kolkata, and Ruhollah Khomeini's rise to power. At the start of the 1990s, he joined France 2 as a reporter. In the 2000s, he created the series  Dans le secret de... alongside Jacques Cotta, which produced over forty issues. In 2015, he launched his book series, titled Le monde selon Cobus.

Martin's death was announced on the evening news broadcast on France 2 on 3 August 2020.

Bibliography
Dans le secret des sectes (1992)
Le Trésor du Magounia
L'Archange du médoc
L'ogre des Landes
La vallée des cobayes
Le seigneur des atolls
La Traque des maîtres flamands
La malédiction de Tévennec
Les Fantômes du mur païen
Le Bonsaï de Brocéliande
Du danger de perdre patience en faisant son plein d'essence (2015)
Bienvenue dans le Bronx (2016)
La Reine noire (2018)
L'Affaire Perceva (2019)

Filmography
Front national la nébuleuse (Envoyé spécial)
Dans le secret de ...

References

1952 births
2020 deaths
French journalists
French male writers